was a Japanese-American singer and actress. Umeki was a Tony Award- and Golden Globe-nominated actress and the first East Asian-American woman to win an Academy Award for acting.

Life
Born in Otaru, Hokkaido, she was the youngest of nine children. Her father owned an iron factory.

After World War II, Umeki began her career as a nightclub singer in Japan, using the name Nancy Umeki. Her early influences were traditional kabuki theater and American pop music. Later, in one of her appearances on The Merv Griffin Show, she treated viewers to her impression of singer Billy Eckstine, one of her American favorites growing up.

Career

She was best known for her Oscar-winning role as Katsumi in the film Sayonara (1957), as well as Mei Li in the Broadway musical and 1961 film Flower Drum Song, and Mrs. Livingston in the television series The Courtship of Eddie's Father. She was a shin Issei, or post-1945 immigrant from Japan.

She recorded for RCA Victor Japan from 1950 to 1954 and appeared in the film Seishun Jazu Musume. She recorded mostly American jazz standards, which she sang partially in Japanese and partially in English, or solely in either language. Some of the songs she sang during this period were "It Isn't Fair", "Sentimental Me", "My Foolish Heart", "With A Song In My Heart", "Again", "Vaya con Dios", "(How Much Is) That Doggie in the Window?" and "I'll Walk Alone". She moved to the United States in 1955 and after appearing on the Arthur Godfrey Talent Scouts (she was a series regular for one season), she signed with the Mercury Records label and released several singles and two albums.

Her appearances on the Godfrey program brought her to the attention of director Joshua Logan, who cast her in Sayonara. Umeki won an Academy Award for Best Supporting Actress for her role in Sayonara. She was the first Asian performer to win an Academy Award for acting.

In 1958, she appeared twice on the variety show The Gisele MacKenzie Show in which she performed "How Deep Is the Ocean". 

In 1958, she was nominated for a Tony Award for Best Leading Actress in a Musical for her performance in the Broadway premiere production of the musical Flower Drum Song, where she played Mei-Li. The show ran for two years. A cover story in Time stated "the warmth of her art works a kind of tranquil magic". Umeki appeared in the film adaptation of the musical. She was nominated for a Golden Globe Award for Flower Drum Song.

Although a guest on many television variety shows, she appeared in only four more movies through 1962, including the film version of Flower Drum Song (1961). The others were Cry for Happy (1961), The Horizontal Lieutenant (1962) and A Girl Named Tamiko (1963).

From 1969 to 1972, she appeared in The Courtship of Eddie's Father as Mrs. Livingston, the housekeeper, for which she was nominated for a Golden Globe Award. She retired from acting following the end of the series.

Personal life and death
Her first marriage, to television director Frederick Winfield "Wynn" Opie in 1958, ended in divorce in 1967. The couple had one son—Michael H. Opie, born in 1964. She married Randall Hood in 1968, who adopted her son, changing his name to Michael Randall Hood. The couple operated a Los Angeles–based business renting editing equipment to film studios and university film programs. Randall Hood died in 1976.

According to her son, Umeki lived in Sherman Oaks for a number of years, then moved to Licking, Missouri to be near her son and his family, which included three grandchildren. She died August 28, 2007, at the age of 78, from cancer.

Discography

RCA Victor Japan (1950–1954)
During her recording career in Japan, Miyoshi recorded the following songs:
 "Sleepy My Love" (1950)
 "Under the Moonlight" (1950)
 "Don't Say That Person's Name" (1950)
 "Evening Whisper" (1950)
 "I Feel Like Crying" (1950)
 "I'm Waiting for You" (1950)
 "One Night of Sorrow" (1951)
 "Misery" (1951)
 "It Isn't Fair" (1951)
 "Sentimental Me" (1951)
 "My Foolish Heart" (1953)
 "Why Don't You Believe Me?" (live) (1953)
 "Again" (1953)
 "Manhattan Moon" (1953)
 "With A Song In My Heart" (1953)
 "I'll Walk Alone" (1953)
 "My Baby's Coming Home" (1953)
 "Silent Night" (1953)
 "I'm Walking Behind You" (1953)
 "(How Much Is) That Doggie in the Window?" (1953)
 "Sayonara (The Japanese Farewell Song)" (1953)
 "My Ichiban Tomodachi" (1953)
 "Vaya con Dios" (1954)
 "Kiss Me Again Stranger" (1954)
 "My Ichiban Tomodachi" (live) (1954)
 "Sayonara (The Japanese Farewell Song)" (live) (1954)
Two other Japanese language songs were recorded in 1952.

Singles on Mercury Records (1955–1959)
She signed with Mercury Records in 1955 and recorded the following 45 rpm singles:
 "How Deep Is the Ocean/Why Talk" (1955)
 "The Little Lost Dog/The Story You're About to Hear Is True" (1956)
 "The Mountain Beyond the Moon/Oh What Good Company We Could Be" (with Red Buttons) (1957)
 "Sayonara (The Japanese Farewell Song)/Be Sweet Tonight" (1957)
 "Sayonara/On and On" (1957)
Miyoshi recorded a version of "Pick Yourself Up" for Mercury Records in 1959, but the song was never released.

Albums on Mercury Records
Miyoshi Sings For Arthur Godfrey (MG-20165) (1956) 
Tracks:
 "If I Give My Heart to You"
 "China Nights (支那 の夜 Shina no yoru)"
 "I'm in the Mood for Love"
 "My Baby's Coming Home"
 "How Deep Is the Ocean?"
 "Slowly Go Out of Your Mind"
 "Teach Me Tonight"
 "Hanna Ko San"
 "Can't Help Loving That Man"
 "'S Wonderful"
 "Over the Rainbow"
 "Sayonara (The Japanese Farewell Song)"

Miyoshi (album) (MG-20568) (1959) 
Tracks:
 "My Heart Stood Still"
 "My Ship"
 "You Make Me Feel So Young"
 "They Can't Take That Away from Me"
 "Sometimes I'm Happy"
 "I'm Old Fashioned"
 "That Old Feeling"
 "Gone with the Wind"
 "Jeepers Creepers"
 "Wonder Why"
 "I Could Write a Book"

Miyoshi – Singing Star of Rodgers and Hammerstein's Flower Drum Song (MGW-12148) (1958) (reissue of the Arthur Godfrey album with some tracks replaced) 
Tracks:
 "Sayonara"
 "If I Give My Heart to You"
 "China Nights (支那 の夜 Shina no yoru)"
 "I'm in the Mood for Love"
 "My Baby's Coming Home"
 "How Deep Is the Ocean?"
 "Slowly Go Out of Your Mind"
 "Teach Me Tonight"
 "Hanna Ko San"
 "Can't Help Loving That Man"
 "Over the Rainbow"
 "The Little Lost Dog"

Film themes
Miyoshi Umeki recorded two theme songs for films in which she appeared:
 "Sayonara" for Sayonara (1957)
 "Cry for Happy" for Cry for Happy (1961)

Cast recordings
Flower Drum Song (Broadway Original Cast; 1958), Sony Records 
Flower Drum Song (Film Soundtrack; 1961), Decca Records

Tracks by Miyoshi Umeki:
 "A Hundred Million Miracles"
 "I Am Going to Like It Here"
 "Don't Marry Me"
 "Wedding Parade/A Hundred Million Miracles"

Filmography

Awards and nominations

References

External links

 
 
 New York Times bio
 

1929 births
2007 deaths
American film actresses
American musical theatre actresses
American women pop singers
American television actresses
Best Supporting Actress Academy Award winners
Deaths from cancer in Missouri
American actresses of Japanese descent
American film actors of Asian descent
American women musicians of Japanese descent
American singers of Asian descent
Japanese women singers
Japanese emigrants to the United States
Japanese musical theatre actresses
People from Otaru
People from Texas County, Missouri
Traditional pop music singers
Musicians from Hokkaido
20th-century Japanese musicians
20th-century American musicians
Nightclub performers
20th-century American women singers
20th-century American singers
20th-century American actresses
21st-century American women